St. John's School is an all-boys' second-cycle Roman Catholic school located at Sekondi in the Western Region of Ghana. The present curriculum falls within the Senior High School system in Ghana, with overall oversight by the Ghana Education Service. Graduates of St. John’s School are affectionately called Old Saints. Graduates include award-winning journalist David Ampofo, Frank Abu former minister of Mines and Energy, former Chief Executive of Korle-Bu Teaching Hospital Felix Anyah, M.K Onnomah, Ghanaian politician and the late Major Maxwell Adam Mahama, and Shasha Marley.

History

St. John's School was founded on January 29, 1952 by Archbishop William Thomas Porter of the Society of African Missions, in response to the government's Accelerated Education policy of 1951. It was founded as a private secondary school and was the first secondary school to be established in the western region. It was named after Rev. John Beenker, the first head of school. Shortly after assuming the post, Beenker became seriously ill. Rev. Father Donelley was interim head, and Rev. Father Francis Kwamena Buah was recalled from postgraduate studies at Cork University in Ireland to head the school.

The school started with three teachers, F. K. Buah, Donelley, and John Quansah and 47 students in two temporary classrooms.

Students 
The students are known as "the Saints" and the past students are known as "Old Saints".

Old Saint Kwesi Kwansa Kennedy, 2018 won the Henry Godson-Afful award of the best performing WASSCE student and was also adjudged the 3rd Best in West Africa 2018 with 8A’s

Headmasters

Notable alumni

Sports
 Solomon Amegatcher - Olympic Athlete
 Samuel Inkoom - Ghanaian Footballer

Politics
 John Frank Abu - Former Western Regional Minister
 Joseph Kofi Adda - Former Member of Parliament and Minister of Energy
 Yaw Owusu Addo - Former acting Director General of the Ghana Broadcasting Corporation, Municipal Chief Executive of the Kwahu West Municipal District
 P.A.V. Ansah - Ghanaian Politician and Journalist
 Wilson Arthur - Politician and CEO of Skyy Media Group
 Samuel Johnfiah - Former MP for Ahanta West (Ghana parliament constituency)

Academics
 Prof. Ebow Bondzie Simpson - Professor of Law, Barrister, Solicitor and Rector of GIMPA
 Prof. Wisdom Tettey - Vice President and Principal of University of Toronto, Scarborough
 Prof. Kwame Awuah Offei - Professor of Mining Engineering and a member of the 38-member advisory board on mineral and Energy Royalty Policy committee by the United States Secretary of Interior 
 Prof. James Hawkins Ephraim - Physical inorganic Chemist and Former Vice Chancellor of Catholic University College of Ghana

Science, Tech and Medicine
 Dr. Felix Anyah - Former CEO of the Korle-Bu Teaching Hospital and Owner of the Holy Trinity Spa and Health Farm
 Dr. Charles Owubah - CEO of Action Against Hunger USA
 Eric Asubonteng - President of the Ghana Chamber of Mines and MD for Anglogold Ashanti

Military
 Peter Faidoo - Chief of Naval Staff of the Ghana Armed Forces
 Major Maxwell Mahama - Late Major of the Ghana Armed Forces lynched by a mob

Journalism
 David Ampofo - Ghanaian Journalist
 Fiifi Adinkra - Ghanaian blogger and Journalist
 Ato Kwamena Dadzie - Ghanaian writer and Journalist of Joy FM
 Philip Osei Bonsu - Broadcast Journalist, Corporate communications executive and Entrepreneur
 Kojo Frimpong of joy fm npp candidate mp for wench

Creative Arts
 Joe Beecham- Gospel musician
 Aka Blay - Guitarist and Musical artist
 Shasha Marley - Reggae Musician
 Papa Nii (Osoephagus) - Veteran Ghanaian Actor
 Albert Mensah - Bestselling Author and the only West African listed on the World’s Top 60 Motivational speakers 
 Keche - Hiplife Musical Duo

See also

 Education in Ghana
 List of senior high schools in Ghana
 Roman Catholicism in Ghana

References

External links
 Official website

1952 establishments in Gold Coast (British colony)
Boys' schools in Ghana
Educational institutions established in 1952
Catholic secondary schools in Ghana
Education in the Western Region (Ghana)
Sekondi-Takoradi